= Camille Losserand =

Swiss kitesurfer

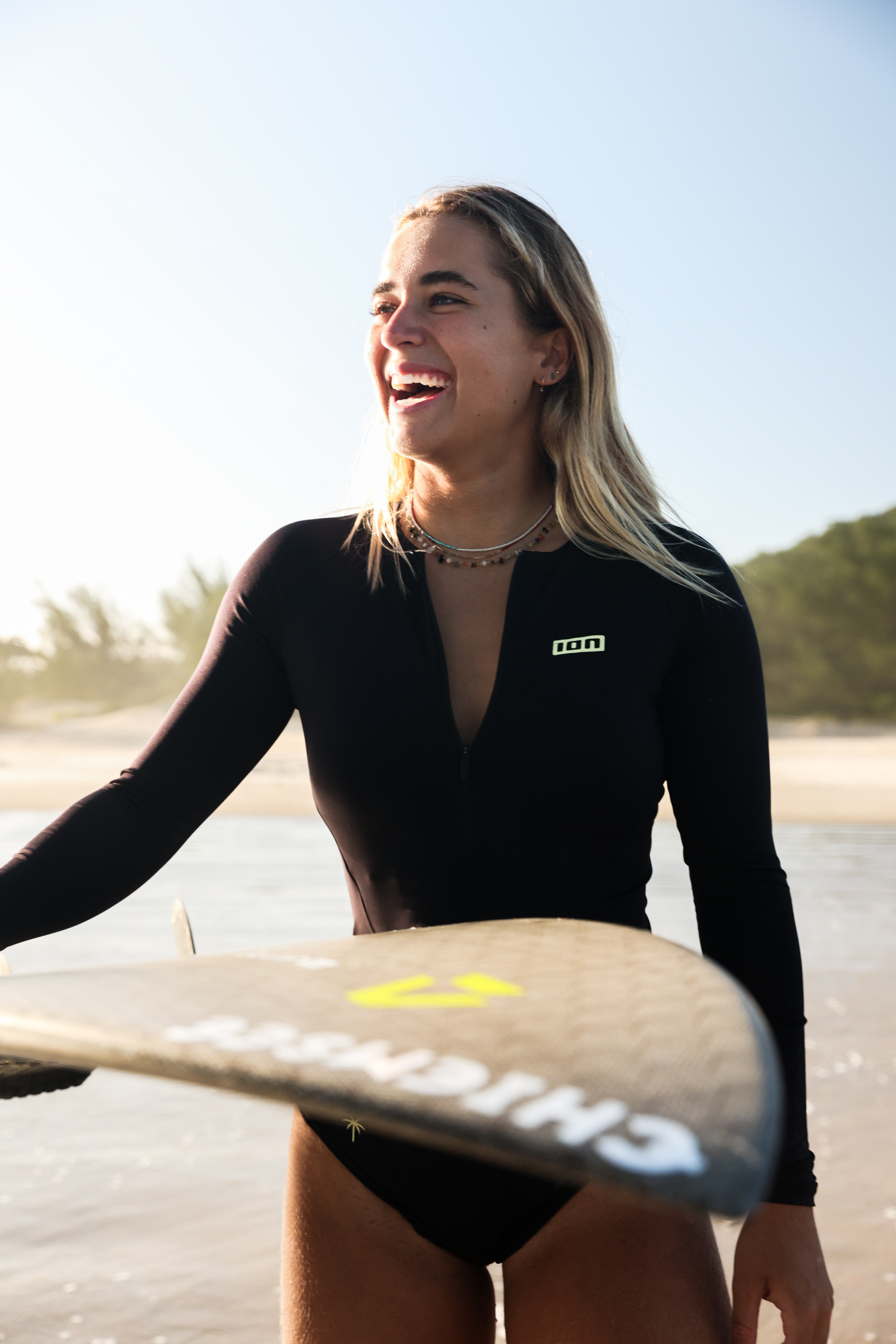
- Camille Losserand kiteboarding
- Born: October 9, 2003 (age 22); Lausanne, Switzerland
- Occupation: Swiss kitesurfer

Camille Losserand (born October 10, 2003, in Lausanne) is a Swiss kite surfer. She is a presence in the GKA World Tour kiteboarding contests and Kite-surf World Champion and was the Swiss Kitesurf Junior Champion in 2021. Camille Losserand is sponsored by Duotone and Ion.

== Titles ==
- 3rd Kite-surf World Champion 2024
- 1st Big Air World Champion 2023 (Tarifa, ES)
- 2nd Kite-Surf Champion 2023 (Sylt/ Germany)
- 3rd place GKA Freestyle 2019
- 4th Kite-Surf Champion 2023 (Cauipe, BRA)
- 4th Kite-Surf Champion 2023 (Saquarema, Rio/ Brazil)
- 4th Kite-Surf Champion 2023 (Dakhla, Morocco)
- 1st Junior World Champion 2022 (Tarifa, ES)
- 2nd Big Air World Champion 2022 (Tarifa, ES)
- 4th Kite-Surf Champion 2022 (Taiba, BRA)
- 4th position in the World Ranking 2022
- 2nd Junior World Champion 2021 (Tarifa, ES)
- 1st Swiss Kitesurf Junior Champion 2021 (Isleten, CH)
- 1st Swiss KiteFoil Junior Champion 2020 (Silvaplana, CH)
